Yuriy Andriyovych Tlumak (born 11 July 2002) is a Ukrainian professional football midfielder who plays for Karpaty Lviv on loan from Zorya Luhansk.

Career
Tlumak was born in Lviv and is a product of Karpaty Lviv academy. He played for the Karpaty youth teams of different levels and participated in the Ukrainian Premier League Reserves and Under 19 championship.

He made his debut for Karpaty as a second time substitute player in the drawing home derby match against Lviv on 27 June 2020 in the Ukrainian Premier League.

Chornomorets Odesa
In July 2021 he moved on loan to Chornomorets Odesa.
On 25 July 2021 he made his league debut in the losing away match against Desna Chernihiv at the Chernihiv Stadium.

Personal life
His father Andriy Tlumak is a retired football player and current manager of Karpaty Lviv and his younger brother Maksym (born 2008) is training with the Karpaty Lviv academy.

Career statistics

Club

References

External links
 
 

2002 births
Living people
Sportspeople from Lviv
Ukrainian footballers
Association football midfielders
Ukrainian Premier League players
FC Karpaty Lviv players
FC Dynamo Kyiv players
FC Chornomorets Odesa players
FC Zorya Luhansk players